AC Dynamique is a football club in Kindu, Democratic Republic of Congo.

History
The club played 2008 in the Linafoot, the top level of professional football in DR Congo.

Achievements
Maniema Provincial League: 2
 2002, 2003

References

Kindu
Football clubs in the Democratic Republic of the Congo